P6, P-6, or P.6 may refer to:
 P6 (microarchitecture), a sixth-generation Intel x86 microprocessor microarchitecture
 POWER6, a sixth-generational IBM microprocessor microarchitecture
 p6 protein, a protein of HIV
 HAT-P-6, a star in the constellation Andromeda
 Integrated Truss Structure#P6, S6 trusses, trusses on the International Space Station
 Rover P6 series, a saloon car model produced from 1963 to 1977 in Solihull, West Midlands, England
 SIG Sauer P225/P6, a variant of the P225 pistol used by West German police forces
 Pentacon Six, a single-lens reflex (SLR) medium format camera system
 Period 6, a period of the periodic table of elements
 Primavera P6, a project management software package by  Primavera (software)
 IATA code for Privilege Style, a charter airline
 Principle 6 campaign, opposing anti-gay Russian laws at the 2014 Olympics
 P6 ATAV, an Indonesian light attack vehicle
 P-6, a variant of the Cold War era Soviet naval cruise missile SS-N-3A Shaddock
PPPPPP (manga), a short hand for the manga by Maporo 3-Gō.

Aircraft
 Curtiss P-6 Hawk, a 1927 American single-engine biplane fighter
 Piaggio P.6, a 1927 Italian catapult-launched reconnaissance floatplane 
 PZL P.6, a 1930 Polish fighter

See also
 P600 (neuroscience), an event-related potential
 6P (disambiguation)
 PPPPPP (disambiguation)